Ekşi is a Turkish surname and may refer to:

People
 Arslan Ekşi (born 1985), Turkish volleyball player
 Oktay Ekşi (born 1932), Turkish journalist, author and politician

See also
 Eksi (disambiguation)
 Ekşi Sözlük, community website

Turkish-language surnames